Adly Yakan Pasha (18 January 1864  – 22 October 1933), sometimes referred to as Adly Pasha, was an Egyptian political figure. He served as the 14th prime minister of Egypt between 1921 and 1922, again between 1926 and 1927, and finally in 1929. He held several prominent political posts including foreign minister, interior minister and Speaker of the Egyptian Senate.

Personal life
Yakan was of Turkish origin.

He died in Paris, France. He was the great-grandnephew of Muhammad Ali Pasha.

References

External links 

1864 births
1933 deaths
19th-century Egyptian people
20th-century prime ministers of Egypt
Egyptian people of Turkish descent
Prime Ministers of Egypt
Foreign ministers of Egypt
Speakers of the Parliament of Egypt
Egyptian pashas